Muamer Taletović (born 4 November 1975) is a Bosnian retired basketball player. He played in Germany, Macedonia and Bosnia. He last played for Triland of the Bosnian League.

References

External links
Eurobasket profile
FIBA profile
FIBA Europe profile

1975 births
Living people
Bosnia and Herzegovina men's basketball players
Shooting guards
Panthers Schwenningen players
BG Karlsruhe players
Basketball players from Sarajevo
Nürnberg Falcons BC players
KK MZT Skopje players
Crailsheim Merlins players